Rowland is an unincorporated community in Pike County, Pennsylvania, United States. Rowland has a post office with ZIP code 18457, which opened on January 20, 1838.

References

Unincorporated communities in Pike County, Pennsylvania
Unincorporated communities in Pennsylvania